The 2015 Copa ASOBAL was the 26th edition of the Copa ASOBAL. It took place like the previous year in the Palacio de los Deportes, in León, Castile and León, on 19 and 20 December 2015. The tournament was hosted by ABANCA Ademar León and León city council, being the sixth time León hosted Copa ASOBAL.

FC Barcelona Lassa won its 11th Copa ASOBAL by defeating Naturhouse La Rioja 35–31 in the Final.

Qualified teams
Qualified teams for this edition are the top three teams on standings at midseason (matchday 15) plus the host team (ABANCA Ademar León).

(*) Host team.

Venue

Matches

Semifinals

Final

TV coverage
The tournament was broadcast in Spain in Canal+ Deportes 2 HD and worldwide via LAOLA1.tv

Top goalscorers

See also
2015–16 Liga ASOBAL
2015–16 Copa del Rey de Balonmano

References

External links
Official website

2015–16 in Spanish handball
Copa ASOBAL